Abner Genece is an actor of Haitian descent.

Biography

Genece was born in Waltham, Massachusetts, but was raised in Cincinnati, Ohio and Miami, Florida. He studied acting at the American Academy of Dramatic Arts and has made numerous appearances on television in such series as Malcolm & Eddie and The District. However, he has received his most acclaim for his work in the theatre.  He received an NAACP Theatre Award for his portrayal of Haitian leader Jean-Jacques Dessalines in the first installment of "For the Love of Freedom," playwright Levy Lee Simon's trilogy about the Haitian revolt. Genece was also honored with a Maddy Award for his lead performance in "Othello."

References

External links
 
 Official site

Year of birth missing (living people)
Living people
American male film actors
American male television actors
American people of Haitian descent